The Gdynia Maritime University  (Polish: Uniwersytet Morski w Gdyni) is one of two colleges in Poland which specialises in educating highly qualified officers for the maritime industry, especially for the merchant navy.

History 

The university was established in 1920 as the Maritime School in Tczew with faculties of navigation and mechanics. In 1930, the school was moved to Gdynia, to a newly built complex of buildings at ul. Morska, and its name was changed to the State Maritime School.  During the war, the school operated in England, Southampton and London.

In 1921 the flag was raised on the first STS Lwów school vessel. In 1930, STS Lwów was replaced with STS Dar Pomorza. It was later replaced by STS Dar Młodzieży.

In 2001, the university received the status of an academy and the name of Gdynia Maritime Academy. 

Until 2009, students were undergoing compulsory, 4-semesters (previously, 6 semesters) military training, taking the military oath and receiving lower military ranks and bearing the title of cadet. The military training ended with an officer's exam, confirmed by a certificate. Currently, the Military School has been withdrawn from the curriculum.

Based on the regulation of the Minister of Maritime Economy and Inland Navigation of July 2, 2018, Gdynia Maritime Academy adopted the University name.

Faculties 

The academy offers full and part-time courses in the following areas:

Department of Entrepreneurship and Commodities
 Commodities
 Management

Department of Maritime Engineering
 Marine Engineering

Department of Nautical Science
 Nautical Science
 Transport and Logistics

Department of Electrical Engineering
 Electrical Engineering 
 Electronics Engineering

Rectors

Notable alumni
 Marek Gróbarczyk, minister of Maritime Economy 
 Miron Babiak, sailor and researcher
 Joanna Pilecka, ambassador to Portugal
 Rafał Bruski, voivode of Kuyavian-Pomeranian Voivodeship

See also

 Karol Olgierd Borchardt
 Maritime University of Szczecin

References

External links 
 
 

 
Universities in Poland
Maritime colleges in Europe
Universities and colleges in Gdynia
1920 establishments in Poland